Once a Greek is a 1966 West German comedy film directed by Rolf Thiele and starring Heinz Rühmann, Irina Demick, and Charles Regnier. It is based on the 1955 novel of the same name by Friedrich Dürrenmatt.

It was made at the Munich Studios of Bavaria Film with location shooting in Greece, Offenburg, and the Swiss resort of Montreux. The film's sets were designed by the art director Robert Stratil.

Cast

References

Bibliography

External links 
 

1966 films
1966 comedy films
German comedy films
West German films
1960s German-language films
Films based on works by Friedrich Dürrenmatt
Films directed by Rolf Thiele
Bavaria Film films
Films shot at Bavaria Studios
1960s German films